Mycena olivaceomarginata is a species of agaric fungus in the family Mycenaceae.  Originally described as Agaricus olivaceomarginata by English mycologist George Edward Massee in 1890, he transferred it to Mycena in 1893. Found in Europe and North America, the mycelium of the fungus is bioluminescent.

It was described from Great Britain.

See also 
List of bioluminescent fungi

References

External links 

olivaceomarginata
Bioluminescent fungi
Fungi described in 1890
Fungi of Europe
Fungi of North America